Yanrakynnot is a rural locality (a selo) in Providensky District of Chukotka Autonomous Okrug, Russia. Population:  Municipally, Yanrakynnot is a part of Yanrakynnot Rural Settlement in Providensky Municipal District.

Etymology
Its name is derived from the Chukchi word for "detached, firm land", although other sources translate it as "the lonely stand", and others still say it means "hard place".

History
Like many of the small rural localities in Chukotka, the amenities of Yanrakynnot were affected by the dissolution of the Soviet Union; the eight-grade school, for example, was downgraded to just a four-grade school.

Geography
Yanrakynnot is located on the shores of the Venetken (lit. "curved") lagoon, linked to the administrative center of the district, the urban-type settlement of Provideniya, by an  unpaved road.

Demographics
The population according to the most recent census data is 338, of whom 185 were male and 153 female, a slight increase on a 2008 estimate of 330.

Economy
Yanrakynnot is a traditional Chukchi locality, with the economy being dominated by whaling. The locality also serves as a base for those wishing to visit Whale Bone Alley on Yttygran Island or Arakamchechen Island.

Climate

Gallery

See also
List of inhabited localities in Providensky District

References

Notes

Sources
W. K. Dallmann. Indigenous Peoples of the north of the Russian Federation, Map 3.6, Chukotskiy Avtonomyy Okrug. 1997.
 
 
 

I. Krupnik and N. Vakhtin In the 'House of Dismay': Knowledge, Culture and Post-Soviet Politics in Chukotka, 1995-6  (2002) in People and the Land. Pathways to Reform in Post-Soviet Siberia, ed. E. Kasten
M Strogoff, P-C Brochet, and D. Auzias Petit Futé: Chukotka (2006). "Avant-Garde" Publishing House.

Rural localities in Chukotka Autonomous Okrug
Providensky District